3rd Street or Third Street may refer to:

3rd Street, Los Angeles
3rd Street (Manhattan)
Third Street (Hong Kong)
Third Street (San Francisco)
T Third Street, Muni Metro line in San Francisco 
N3RD Street (Philadelphia)
 Third Street, Singapore, a road in Siglap

See also 
3rd Street station (disambiguation), train stations of the name
Third Avenue (disambiguation)